Nancy McWilliams, Ph.D., ABPP., is Emerita Visiting Professor at the Graduate School of Applied and Professional Psychology at Rutgers University. She has written on personality and psychotherapy.

McWilliams is a psychoanalytic/dynamic author, teacher, supervisor, and therapist. She has a private practice in psychotherapy and supervision in Lambertville, New Jersey. She is a former president of the Division of Psychoanalysis (39) of the American Psychological Association (APA).

Biography
Born in 1945 in Abington, Pennsylvania, she grew up in Longmeadow, Massachusetts, New Canaan, Connecticut, and Wyomissing, Pennsylvania. She graduated from Oberlin College in 1967, with honors in Political Science. Subsequently, she studied Psychology at Brooklyn College and then received her Master's and Doctoral degrees from Rutgers University in Psychology (Personality and Social). In 1978 she was licensed as an independent psychologist in New Jersey and also graduated from the National Psychological Association for Psychoanalysis in New York. Since 2010, she has been Board Certified in Psychoanalysis in Psychology. 

In 2011, the American Psychological Association chose her to represent psychoanalytic therapy in the remake of the classic film, Three Approaches to Psychotherapy. In 2015, she was asked to be the plenary speaker at the American Psychological Association convention in Toronto, Canada. She is a member of the Center for  Psychotherapy and Psychoanalysis of New Jersey and an Honorary Member of the American Psychoanalytic Association, the Moscow Psychoanalytic Society, the Institute for Psychoanalytic Therapy in Turin, Italy, and the Warsaw Scientific Association for Psychodynamic Psychotherapy.  She has given graduation addresses at the Smith College School for Social Work and the Yale University School of Medicine. In the summer of 2016 she was the Erikson Scholar at the Austen Riggs Center in Stockbridge, Massachusetts. In 2016, she taught a course on "The Minister and Mental Health" at Princeton Theological Seminary. Her books are available in 20 languages, and she has taught in 30 countries.

Her areas of specialty include psychoanalytic theories, individual differences, personality, the relationship between psychological diagnosis and treatment, alternatives to DSM diagnostic conventions, integration of feminist theory and psychoanalytic knowledge, and the application of psychoanalytic understanding to the problems of diverse clinical populations.

Publications
She is author of Psychoanalytic Diagnosis (1994; rev. ed. 2011), Psychoanalytic Case Formulation (1999), Psychoanalytic Psychotherapy (2004), and Psychoanalytic Supervision (2021) all with Guilford Press. She has edited and contributed to several other books, and is Associate Editor of the Psychodynamic Diagnostic Manual (2006; 2nd ed. 2017). Her writings have been translated into 20 languages.

Awards
Awards include the Gradiva Prize for her second and fourth books, the Rosalee Weiss award for contributions to practice, the Division of Psychoanalysis awards for leadership (2005), scholarship (2012), and international academic excellence (2021), the Laughlin distinguished teacher award, the Goethe Scholarship award, and the Hans Strupp award for teaching, practice and writing.

References

External links
Official website

American psychoanalysts
Rutgers University faculty
Year of birth missing (living people)
Living people
Nationality missing
Place of birth missing (living people)
Brooklyn College alumni
Oberlin College alumni